William Barnes (December 29, 1919 – November 21, 1996) was an American baseball pitcher in the Negro leagues. He played from 1941 to 1947 with the Baltimore Elite Giants, Memphis Red Sox, and the Indianapolis Clowns. He did not play in 1944 and 1945 due to military service in World War II.

Personal life
Barnes served in the United States Army during World War II, and worked as a military policeman in California.

References

External links
 and Seamheads 
Negro League Baseball Museum

1919 births
1996 deaths
Baseball players from Birmingham, Alabama
Indianapolis Clowns players
Memphis Red Sox players
Baltimore Elite Giants players
United States Army personnel of World War II
American military police officers
African Americans in World War II
Baseball pitchers
African-American United States Army personnel